Arcadia, Virginia may refer to:
Arcadia, Botetourt County, Virginia
Arcadia, Spotsylvania County, Virginia